Groß Labenzer See is a lake in the Nordwestmecklenburg district in Mecklenburg-Vorpommern, Germany. At an elevation of 24.6 m, its surface area is 2.3 km².

External links 
 

Lakes of Mecklenburg-Western Pomerania